Methylenebis(dibutyldithiocarbamate) is the organosulfur compound with the formula CH2(SC(S)NBu2)2 (Bu = C4H9).  It is a derivative of dibutyldithiocarbamate that is used as an additive to various lubricants, both as an antioxidant and to prevent metal surfaces.  It is prepared by alkylation of the dithiocarbamate with dichloromethane. Although it is described as colored, simple esters of dithiocarbamate are typically colorless.

References

Dithiocarbamates
Oil additives